David A. Vaudt is an American politician who is a former Auditor of State of the U.S. state of Iowa. A Republican, he was first elected to the office in November 2002 and took office in January 2003. He was re-elected in November 2006 and 2010. Vaudt announced his resignation as state Auditor in April 2013 after being named the next chairman of the Governmental Accounting Standards Board (GASB), which he took office on July 1, 2013. Gov. Terry Branstad appointed Mary Mosiman, a former county auditor who was serving as the Deputy Secretary of State, as the new State Auditor.  Mosiman started in the office on May 13, 2013.

Electoral history

External links
Official site
Campaign site

References

Iowa Republicans
State Auditors of Iowa
Year of birth missing (living people)
Living people